Incarvillea is a genus of about 16 species of flowering plants in the family Bignoniaceae, native to central and eastern Asia, with most of the species growing at high altitudes in the Himalaya and Tibet. The most familiar species is Incarvillea delavayi, a garden plant commonly known as hardy gloxinia or Chinese trumpet flower. Unlike most other members of Bignoniaceae, which are mainly tropical woody plants, species of Incarvillea are herbaceous perennial plants from temperate regions.

Genetic analysis supports the division of the genus into five clades: the subgenus Niedzwedzkia, the subgenus Amphicome, the subgenus Incarvillea, the subgenus Pteroscleris, and the species I. olgae, which does not fit into a subgenus. It may be given a subgenus of its own in a future study.

Incarvillea is named after the French Jesuit missionary and botanist Pierre Nicholas Le Chéron d'Incarville.

Species include:
Incarvillea altissima
Incarvillea arguta
Incarvillea beresowskii
Incarvillea compacta
Incarvillea delavayi
Incarvillea dissectifoliola
Incarvillea emodi (Royle ex Lindl.) Chatterjee
Incarvillea forrestii
Incarvillea lutea
Incarvillea mairei
Incarvillea olgae
Incarvillea potaninii
Incarvillea semiretschenskia
Incarvillea sinensis (syn. I. variabilis)
Incarvillea younghusbandii
Incarvillea zhongdianensis

Chemistry
Incarvillea sinensis contains the alkaloid incarvillateine.

Gallery

Notes

References

Bignoniaceae
Bignoniaceae genera
Flora of Tibet